Ampelodesmos is a  genus of Mediterranean plants in the grass family, which is known by the common names stramma, Mauritania grass, rope grass, and dis(s) grass. It is classified in its own tribe Ampelodesmeae within the grass subfamily Pooideae.

The genus probably originated through ancient hybrid speciation, as a cross between parents from tribes Stipeae and Phaenospermateae.

Ampelodesmos mauritanicus is a large clumping perennial bunchgrass, which is native to the Mediterranean region. It has been introduced outside its native range and is cultivated as an ornamental grass. Its nodding flower panicles can be nearly two feet long. In its native area it is used as a fiber for making mats, brooms, and twine. The plant can become an Invasive species in non-native ecosystems beyond the Mediterranean Basin. 
Its nodding flower panicles can be nearly two feet long. In its native area it is used as a fiber for making mats, brooms, and twine. The leaves of this grass are really quite savage and can inflict small cuts and cause irritating red raised areas on unwary hikers.

The genus name comes from the Greek ampelos, "vine", and desmos, "bond", from its former use as a string to tie up grapevines.

 Species
 Ampelodesmos ampelodesmon (Cirillo) Kerguélen -  Sicily
 Ampelodesmos mauritanicus (Poir.) T.Durand & Schinz - Spain incl Balearic Is, France incl Corsica, Italy incl Sardinia + Sicily, Greece, Algeria, Morocco, Tunisia, Libya

 formerly included
see Cortaderia 
 Ampelodesmos australis - Cortaderia pilosa

References

External links

 Calphotos, University of California @ Berkeley, Photo gallery
 

Matorral shrubland
Bunchgrasses of Europe
Fiber plants
Poaceae genera
Pooideae